Triolo  may refer to:
 a torrent near San Severo in Italy
 Triolo Airfield, an abandoned field part of Foggia Airfield Complex 
 a station situated on Line 1 of Lille metro in France